Givira saladota is a moth in the family Cossidae. It is found in Argentina.

References

Natural History Museum Lepidoptera generic names catalog

Moths described in 1911
Givira